Golchehreh Sadjadiye (born 1954 in Arak, Iran) is an Iranian actress. She graduated in theatre from FFATU (1977), started film acting with The Crow (1977, Bahram Bayzai). In her subtle performances, she has appeared as an independent and stubborn woman. She won the prize of Best Actress for Land of the Sun (1996, A. Darvish) from the Fajr International Film Festival.

Some of her plays 
 The Wave of the Tempest, 1981
 The Station, 1987
 Snake Fang, 1990
 The Sergeant, 1990
 The Wolf’s Trail, 1992
 The Fall, 1993

References

External links 
 

1954 births
Living people
People from Arak, Iran
Iranian film actresses
Iranian stage actresses
Iranian television actresses
Crystal Simorgh for Best Actress winners